The 1983 Brown Bears football team was an American football team that represented Brown University during the 1983 NCAA Division I-AA football season. Brown tied for third place in the Ivy League. 

In their eleventh and final season under head coach John Anderson, the Bears compiled a 4–5–1 record and were outscored 237 to 204. John Daniel and J. Potter were the team captains. 

The Bears' 4–2–1 conference record tied for third-best in the Ivy League standings. They outscored Ivy opponents 157 to 138. 

Brown played its home games at Brown Stadium in Providence, Rhode Island.

Schedule

References

Brown
Brown Bears football seasons
Brown Bears football